Asian market could mean:
 Asian financial markets, see List of stock exchanges and List of futures exchanges for a comprehensive list.
 Asian supermarket